Jeff Fitzgerald (born October 12, 1966) is an American businessman and politician who served as the 78th Speaker of the Wisconsin State Assembly during the 100th Wisconsin Legislature. A Republican, he represented the 39th Assembly District from 2001 until 2013. He ran for the United States Senate in 2012, but lost the Republican primary by a wide margin to former Governor Tommy Thompson. After leaving the Assembly, he became a lobbyist.

Early life and education
Born in Chicago, Illinois, Fitzgerald moved with his family to Hustisford, Wisconsin. After graduating from Hustisford High School, Fitzgerald attended University of Wisconsin-Green Bay and received his bachelor's degree from the University of Wisconsin-Oshkosh.

Career 
He was a small business owner and served on the Beaver Dam, Wisconsin Common Council from 2000 to 2003. He is a member of the Chicago Mercantile Exchange.

Wisconsin State Assembly

Elections
He was elected in 2000. In 2002, he won re-election unopposed. In 2004, he won re-election a third term with 70% of the vote. In 2006, he won re-election to a fourth term with 63% of the vote. In 2008, he won re-election to a fifth term with 60% of the vote. In 2010, he won re-election to a sixth term unopposed. In 2012, he decided against running for re-election, instead announcing, in October 2011, that he would seek the Republican nomination for the U.S. Senate seat vacated by retiring US Senator Herb Kohl.

2012 U.S. Senate election

In October 2011, Fitzgerald announced that he would run for the United States Senate seat being vacated by retiring Senator Herb Kohl, a Democrat. He lost the nomination on August 14, 2012 in a four-way primary battle against former Governor Tommy Thompson (the winner), millionaire Eric Hovde, and former Congressman Mark Neumann.

Personal life
Jeff Fitzgerald lives with his wife, Andrea, and two children in Horicon, Wisconsin. Jeff's state assembly district was coextensive with the northeastern portion of Scott's state senate district; in Wisconsin, state senate districts are formed by combining three state assembly districts.

References

External links
 
 
2008 campaign contributions for Jeff Fitzgerald,
2006 campaign contributions Jeff Fitzgerald,
2004 campaign contributions Jeff Fitzgerald,
2002 campaign contributions Jeff Fitzgerald,
2000 campaign contributions Jeff Fitzgerald

1966 births
Living people
People from Horicon, Wisconsin
Speakers of the Wisconsin State Assembly
Republican Party members of the Wisconsin State Assembly
University of Wisconsin–Oshkosh alumni
Wisconsin city council members
21st-century American politicians
People from Hustisford, Wisconsin
People from Beaver Dam, Wisconsin